William Smith (April 12, 1728 – March 27, 1814) was an American politician and representative of the fourth congressional district of Maryland in the United States House of Representatives.

Smith was born in Donegal Township of Lancaster County in the Province of Pennsylvania.  He moved to Baltimore, Maryland, in 1761, and was appointed a member of the committee of correspondence in 1774, and a member of the committee of observation in 1775. Smith was also one of a committee appointed by the Continental Congress to constitute a naval board in 1777.

Smith was chosen as a Maryland delegate to the Continental Congress in 1777.  He subsequently pursued a career as a merchant, and then was elected to the 1st United States Congress, from March 4, 1789, until March 3, 1791.  Smith was the First Auditor of the United States Treasury from July 16, 1791, to November 27, 1791.  He returned to local politics to be elected to the Maryland Senate in 1801.  Smith died in Baltimore and was interred in the Old Westminster Graveyard.

Smith's daughter Mary was married to Gen. Otho Holland Williams, founder of Williamsport, Maryland. Williams served in the Revolutionary War as Deputy Adjutant General to both Gens. Horatio Gates and Nathanael Greene.

References

Further reading
 Information about Smith's residency in Baltimore on land now included in Herring Run Park: 

1728 births
1814 deaths
People of colonial Pennsylvania
People from Lancaster County, Pennsylvania
American Presbyterians
Continental Congressmen from Maryland
18th-century American politicians
Maryland state senators
Members of the United States House of Representatives from Maryland
Burials in Maryland